Bertrand Piccard FRSGS (born 1 March 1958) is a Swiss explorer, psychiatrist and environmentalist. Along with Brian Jones, he was the first to complete a non-stop balloon flight around the globe, in a balloon named Breitling Orbiter 3. He was the initiator, chairman, and pilot, with André Borschberg, of Solar Impulse, the first successful round-the-world solar-powered flight. In 2012 Piccard was designated as a Champions of the Earth by the UN Environment Programme. He is the founder and chairman of the Solar Impulse Foundation.

Piccard was born in Lausanne, Switzerland. His grandfather Auguste Piccard was a balloonist and undersea explorer, and his father Jacques Piccard was an undersea explorer.

Biography

Early life

As a child, Piccard was taken to the launch of several space flights from Cape Canaveral. Initially afraid of heights, at age 16 he took up hang gliding. He developed early interests in flight and human behaviour in extreme situations. He received a degree from the University of Lausanne in psychiatry. He has since become a lecturer and supervisor at the Swiss Medical Society for Hypnosis (SMSH).

Piccard obtained licences to fly balloons, airplanes, gliders, and motorized gliders. In Europe, he was one of the pioneers of hang gliding and microlight flying during the 1970s. He became the European hang-glider aerobatics champion in 1985.

Breitling Orbiter 

On 1 March 1999, Piccard and Brian Jones took off in the balloon Breitling Orbiter 3, a bright red, carbon-composite, egg-shaped craft measuring sixteen feet long and seven feet in diameter, from Château d'Oex in Switzerland on the first successful non-stop balloon circumnavigation of the globe—- the first in-atmospheric circumnavigation not requiring any fuel for forward motion. Piccard and Jones, in cooperation with a team of meteorologists on the ground, maneuvered into a series of jet streams that carried them 25,361 miles to land in Egypt after a  flight lasting 19 days, 21 hours, and 47 minutes. In recognition of this accomplishment, Piccard received awards including the Harmon Trophy, the FAI Gold Air Medal and the Charles Green Salver.

Solar Impulse 

During November 2003, Piccard announced a project, in cooperation with the École Polytechnique Fédérale de Lausanne (EPFL), for a solar-powered, long-range aircraft named Solar Impulse. Piccard began construction during 2007, and conducted brief test flights during 2009 with André Borschberg. By 2006, he had assembled a multi-disciplinary team of fifty specialists from six countries, assisted by approximately one hundred outside advisers.

The project was financed by a number of private companies and individuals in Europe. The first company to fund the project officially was Semper, after Eric Freymond was convinced of its future success by Piccard. Owing to international funding for the project, the Solar Impulse is a European craft, not a Swiss one, despite scientific and medical assistance from the EPFL and Hirslanden Clinique Cecil.

During 2010, Solar Impulse 1 (Si1) made its first nighttime flight. During 2011, it landed at Bourget Field in Paris. During 2012, it made its first intercontinental flight from Switzerland to Morocco in two legs. The first leg in the one-seater aircraft was piloted by Borschberg from Payerne, Switzerland to Madrid, Spain, and the second leg by Piccard from Madrid to Rabat, Morocco. During 2013, he and Borschberg traversed the United States from Mountain View, California to JFK Airport in New York City. There were several stops along the way, including Washington, D.C. 

During 2015, the objective was to accomplish the first round-the-world solar flight in history. The voyage consisted of multiple flights starting on 9 March and scheduled to conclude about five months later. In order to switch pilots, stopovers were scheduled at locations in India, Myanmar, China, United States, and southern Europe or northern Africa. Piccard piloted the ninth segment of the round-the-world trip and landed the Solar Impulse 2 (Si2) in Moffett Field in California on 24 April 2016 after three days of flying from Kalaeloa Airport, Hawaii.

André Borschberg and Piccard completed their circumnavigation of the globe with the solar-powered aircraft Solar Impulse on 26 July 2016. On the same day, they announced the creation of the World Alliance for Clean Technologies.

For his role in delivering and piloting Solar Impulse, Bertrand was awarded the Mungo Park Medal by the Royal Scottish Geographical Society in 2018. This was awarded jointly with André Borschberg.

The UN and the World Alliance 
Piccard was named a Goodwill Ambassador for the UN Environment Programme in December 2015, partway through his solar flight around the world. Four months after the completion of the flight, during the 2016 United Nations Climate Change Conference, Piccard and the Solar Impulse Foundation launched the UNEP-endorsed non-profit World Alliance for Clean Technologies.

In January 2018 Piccard told the Economic Times that in his travels he had collected more than 500 ideas to protect the environment that were also profitable from a total of five continents.

In May 2018, Piccard and his Foundation announced the Efficient Solutions Label, a designation given to qualifying solutions after a four-week evaluation headed by World Alliance experts. In 2021 Piccard told Forbes that the foundation had identified and certified 1000 solutions, profit-making for both companies and consumers.

Hydrogen Car Record 
In 2019, Piccard set a record for the most miles driven by a hydrogen car without refueling, driving a Hyundai NEXO hydrogen-powered SUV for a total trip of 778 kilometers (483.4 miles) in Europe, with the goal to promote hydrogen technology.

Solar Impulse Foundation 
Following his round-the-world solar flight with Solar Impulse, Bertrand Piccard launched the Solar Impulse Foundation. Its goal is to select innovative solutions to the environmental crisis and promote them to decision-makers in order to accelerate the transition to a sustainable economy. To select these clean solutions, the Solar Impulse Foundation created the Solar Impulse Efficient Solution Label in May 2018.

This certification is attributed following a strict assessment process made by a pool of independent experts, and it recognizes both the economic profitability and environmental impact of products, processes and services. The Label is awarded to solutions which contribute to the achievement of one of the five Sustainable Development Goals related to water, energy, consumption and production, industry, cities and communities. In April 2021, Bertrand Piccard and the Solar Impulse Foundation achieved its goal of selecting the first 1000 solutions.

A family tree of adventurers 
Piccard's family tree includes four generations of explorers. His grandfather, Auguste Piccard, was the first to fly to the stratosphere, in 1931. His father, Jacques Piccard, was first to descend to the bottom of the Mariana Trench, in 1960. His great uncle Jean Félix Piccard  and aunt Jeannette Piccard were also balloonists, with their son Donald Piccard first to fly across the English Channel in a balloon. The family's attitude, Piccard once explained, is that being told that something is impossible is " exactly why we try to do it."

Personal life 
Bertrand Piccard is married, and is the father of three children.

Awards and honours 
 Honorary Professor and Honorary Doctor of Science and Letters
 Mungo Park Medal 2018 of the Royal Scottish Geographical Society
 Gold Medal of Youth and Sport
 Harmon Trophy
 Hubbard Medal (1999)
 Golden Plate Award of the American Academy of Achievement (1999)
 FAI Gold Air Medal
 Winner of the first trans-Atlantic balloon race (1992 Chrysler Challenge)
  Légion d'Honneur (Chevalier)
  Officer of the Order of the Alawites
 Médaille de l'aéronautique

Works
 Changer d'Altitude (Éditions Stock, Paris) 2014 
 The Greatest Adventure (Headline, London) 1999  or Around the world in 20 Days (same content published by Wiley, New York) 1999  — pictured
 Quand le vent souffle dans le sens de ton chemin (out of print) 1993 
 Une trace dans le ciel (Robert Laffont, Paris) 1999

See also
 List of firsts in aviation
 List of circumnavigations

Notes and references

External links

 Bertrand Piccard's website
 Bertrand Piccard's CV
 Article in Popular Mechanics
 Solar Impulse website
 Speech by Bertrand Piccard on TED website
 Bertrand Piccard at Blue Tech Innovation Awards
 Swiss Adventurer Launches Quest to 'Fly Forever', National Geographic, 6 March 2015
 

Swiss psychiatrists
Swiss balloonists
Harmon Trophy winners
Flight distance record holders
People from Lausanne
University of Lausanne alumni
Britannia Trophy winners
Recipients of the Olympic Order
1958 births
Living people
Balloon flight record holders
Swiss aviation record holders